Approximate inference methods make it possible to learn realistic models from big data by trading off computation time for accuracy, when exact learning and inference are computationally intractable.

Major methods classes 

Laplace's approximation
Variational Bayesian methods 
Markov chain Monte Carlo
Expectation propagation
Markov random fields 
Bayesian networks
Variational message passing
 Loopy and generalized belief propagation

See also
Statistical inference
Fuzzy logic
Data mining

References

External links

Data management